Pediopsoides is a genus of leafhoppers in the family Cicadellidae.

Species

 Pediopsoides alba Li, Dai & Li, 2016
 Pediopsoides amplificata Li, Dai & Li, 2016
 Pediopsoides bispinata Li, Dai & Li, 2012
 Pediopsoides damingshanensis Li, Dai & Li, 2013
 Pediopsoides dapitana Merino 1936
 Pediopsoides davisi Knull 1940
 Pediopsoides distinctus Van Duzee, 1890
 Pediopsoides femorata Hamilton 1980
 Pediopsoides formosanus Matsumura, 1912
 Pediopsoides jingdongensis Zhang, 2010
 Pediopsoides kodaiana Viraktamath 1996
 Pediopsoides kurentsovi Anufriev 1977
 Pediopsoides longiapophysis Li, Dai & Li, 2016
 Pediopsoides medeia Linnavuori 1978
 Pediopsoides membrana Zhang, 2010
 Pediopsoides nigrolabium Li, Dai & Li, 2012
 Pediopsoides pectinata Viraktamath 1996
 Pediopsoides quartaui Linnavuori 1978
 Pediopsoides satsumensis Matsumura 1912
 Pediopsoides serrata Linnavuori 1978
 Pediopsoides sharmai Viraktamath 1981
 Pediopsoides striolatus Liu & Zhang, 2002
 Pediopsoides testacea Linnavuori 1978
 Pediopsoides tishetshini Li, Dai & Li, 2013

References

Further reading

External links

 

Eurymelinae
Cicadellidae genera